Bhabhi (Sister-in-Law) is a 1938 social family drama Hindi film directed by Franz Osten. The film was based on a Bengali novel written by Sharadindu Bandyopadhyay
called "Bisher Dhoan" ("বিষের ধোঁয়া"). Bandyopadhyay was a famous Bengali novelist and short story writer also known for the fictional detective he created, Byomkesh Bakshi. The cinematographers were Wirsching and Pareenja. Dialogues and lyrics by J. S. Casshyap. V. H. Desai, the comedian, got his "big break" in Bhabhi when he joined Bombay Talkies. He became popular as the nervous father of the heroine Renuka Devi. S. N. Tripathi started his acting with a small role in the film. The film had the new found Renuka Devi in the lead.

The cast included P. Jairaj, Maya Devi as the young widow, with V. H. Desai, Rama Shukal, Meera, M. Nazir, P. F. Pithawala.

The film is family social drama, which deals with the issue of young widows. It put a special focus on the Indian society's attitude towards them, and society's bigoted approach to  "man- woman relationships".

Plot
Kishore (P. Jairaj) is a morally respectable man. When his friend is dying, he extracts a promise from Kishore to look after his distraught young wife Bimala (Maya Devi). Bimala is alone in the world and has no family to go to. Considering her to be his sister-in-law (Bhabhi), Kishore brings Bimala to his house. Though their relationship is that of a brother and sister, it is frowned upon by society. Kishore does not allow society's disapproval to affect them. He falls in love with his new neighbour Renu (Renuka Devi). Renu lives with her father, who appears as a shaky and nervy man. Anupam (Rama Shukal) also wants to marry Renu as she's wealthy. Bela (Meera) Anupam's cousin develops a crush on Kishore. Anupam causes problems for Renu and Kishore by starting gossip bout Bimala and Kishore. The story follows that line till all misunderstandings are cleared and Renu and Kishore can marry.

Cast
 Renuka Devi as Renu, the neighbour, sympathetic to and in love with Kishore
 P.Jairaj as Kishore, the young man who looks after his dead friend's widow
 Meera as Bela, the young society girl
 Maya Devi as Bimala, the young widow left in Kishore's care.
 M. Nazir
 P.F.Pithawala as Kishore's Professor from college days
 V.H.Desai as Renu's nervous dithering father
 Gyan Chandra
 Rama Shukul as Anupam, the main villain who puts obstacles in Renu and Kishore's love story
 Agajani Kashmiree
 Saroj Borkar
 Pratima
 Vimala Devi
 Ranibala
 Lalita Debulkar			
 K.B.Mangale			
 D.V.Surve

Review and Reception

The film was released on 17 December 1938 at Bombay's Roxy Talkies. Renuka Devi's performance was cited as "commendable". Baburao Patel, editor of the cine-magazine Filmindia, in his review of Bhabhi in the January 1938 issue, called Renuka a "remarkable discovery" with a performance "that has distinctive grace" and that "Bombay Talkies have found another Devika (Rani)". V. H. Desai as the "nervous father" was "superb". Rama Shukal was stated to be a good addition to Indian cinema. Jairaj's acting came in for praise for its expression of "suppressed rage" and "grief". The direction was praised for being "subtle", "clever" and that Osten had "excelled himself".

The film was claimed to be a "tremendous success" by Patel of Filmindia in his February 1939 issue. Renuka Devi was hailed as a "star" and her success was cited as a "welcome sign of better class ladies taking up the film career".

Soundtrack
One of the memorable monsoon songs "Jhuki Aayi Re Badariya Sawan Ki" is cited as an evergreen classic. The music was composed by Saraswati Devi, for whom the film was a musical hit. The singers were Renuka Devi, Meera, Saroj Borkar, S. N. Tripathi.

Song List

References

External links
 
 Bhabhi (1938) on YouTube

1938 films
1930s Hindi-language films
Indian black-and-white films
Films directed by Franz Osten
Indian drama films
1938 drama films
Hindi-language drama films
Films based on works by Saradindu Bandopadhyay